Zamen Jan (also Romanized as Ẕāmen Jān; also known as Jamunjān and Zāmerjān) is a village in Sedeh Rural District, in the Central District of Arak County, Markazi Province, Iran. At the 2006 census, its population was 1,634, in 486 families.

References 

Populated places in Arak County